Kymenlaakso ("Kymi/Kymmene Valley") is a region in Finland. It borders the regions of Uusimaa, Päijät-Häme, South Savo and South Karelia and Russia (Leningrad Oblast). Its name means literally The Valley of River Kymi. Kymijoki is one of the biggest rivers in Finland with a drainage basin with 11% of the area of Finland. The city of Kotka with 51,000 inhabitants is located at the delta of River Kymi and has the most important import harbour in Finland. Other cities are Kouvola further in the inland which has after a municipal merger 81,000 inhabitants and the old bastion town Hamina.

Kymenlaakso was one of the first industrialized regions of Finland. It became the most important region for paper and pulp industry in Finland. Since the late 1900s many plants have closed, which has caused some deindustrialization, unemployment and population decline in Kymenlaakso, especially in those communes that were built around plants such as Myllykoski in Kouvola.

Historical provinces 
For history, geography and culture see: Uusimaa, Karelia and Tavastia

Municipalities 

The region of Kymenlaakso is made up of six municipalities, of which three have city status (marked in bold).

Kotka-Hamina Sub-region: 
 Kotka
Population: 
 Hamina (Fredrikshamn)
Population: 
 Pyhtää (Pyttis)
Population: 
 Virolahti (Vederlax)
Population: 
 Miehikkälä
Population: 

Kouvola Sub-region:
 Kouvola
Population: 

Former municipalities:
 Kuusankoski
 Elimäki
 Anjala
 Haapasaari
 Kymi
 Karhula
 Anjalankoski
 Valkeala
 Jaala
 Vehkalahti

Politics 
Results of the 2019 Finnish parliamentary election in Kymenlaakso:

Social Democratic Party  24.73%
Finns Party  20.93%
National Coalition Party  18.21%
Centre Party  11.64%
Green League  8.64%
Left Alliance  6.34%
Christian Democrats  4.85%
Movement Now   1.83%
Blue Reform   1.68%
Seven Star Movement   0.33%
Other parties   0.82%

References

External links 

Regional Council of Kymenlaakso

 
Southern Finland Province
Regions of Finland